The 2006–07 Spartan South Midlands Football League season is the 10th in the history of Spartan South Midlands Football League a football competition in England.

Premier Division

The Premier Division featured 16 clubs which competed in the division last season, along with five new clubs.

Four clubs, transferred from disbanded Isthmian League Division Two:
Chalfont St Peter
Edgware Town
Hertford Town
Kingsbury Town
Plus:
Colney Heath, promoted from Division One

Also, Kingsbury Town merged with London Tigers and formed Kingsbury London Tigers.

League table

Division One

Division One featured 16 clubs which competed in the division last season, along with one new club:

Harpenden Town, relegated from the Premier Division

Also, Bedford United & Valerio changed name to Bedford Valerio United.

League table

Division Two

Division Two featured 18 clubs, all competed in the division last season.

League table

References

External links
 Spartan South Midlands Football League

2006–07
9